David Auker is a British film and television actor.

Filmography

Film 
Unman, Wittering and Zigo (1971) .... Aggeridge
Confessions of a Pop Performer (1975) .... Zombie (Kipper)
Adventures of a Taxi Driver (1976) .... 2nd kidnapper
Emily (1976) .... Billy
Stand Up, Virgin Soldiers (1977) .... Lantry
A Bridge Too Far (1977) .... 'Taffy' Brace
The Spy Who Loved Me (1977) .... LS RP2 Peters (HMS Ranger Crewman)
Confessions from a Holiday Camp (1977) .... Alberto Smarmi
Cola, Candy, Chocolate (1979) .... Johnny Smith
Last Resort (2000) .... 2nd Council Official
Bridget Jones: The Edge of Reason (2004) .... Clive (final film role)

Television 

Crossroads (1964) .... Arnold Jenkins
Hans Brinker (1969) .... Jacob
The Worker (1970) .... Skinhead
Shades of Greene (1975) .... Chemist's assistant
Get Some In! (1976) .... AC1 cook Dunlop
The Mayor of Casterbridge (1978) .... Policeman
Danger UXB (1979) .... Sapper Baines
Minder (1980) .... Chas
Shoestring (1980) .... Reg Kendall, Auditionee
Dangerous Davies: The Last Detective (1981) .... Tarquin
Bergerac (1981) .... Press Man
Q.E.D. (1982) .... Dutch Taxi Driver
The Chinese Detective ....(1982) .... Sgt. Western
Hammer House of Mystery and Suspense (1985) .... Removal man
Bottle Boys (1984–1985) .... Billy Watson
The Bill (1987–2002) .... Geoff Kirkwood / Off Licence Manager / Hutchinson / Mr. Batt / Pub Landlord / Mr. Foulkes 
Emmerdale Farm (1994) .... Clive Simmons
The Politician's Wife (1995) .... Labour Party member
The Girl (1996) .... Walters

References

External links

British male film actors
Living people
Year of birth missing (living people)
British male television actors